Statecraft may refer to:

 Statecraft (game), a card game
 The politics of a state (polity)
 The use of power in international relations
 Statecraft: Strategies for a Changing World, a 2003 book by Margaret Thatcher